Suzana Dinić (born 1 June 1986 in Zaječar, Serbia, SFR Yugoslavia) is a Serbian singer and pianist and a member of the girlband Beauty Queens, which was formed by gathering backing vocalists of Marija Šerifović after victory in the Eurovision Song Contest 2007

Before Beauty Queens 
Dinić was born on 1 June 1986. At the age of 16, she enrolled in the Faculty of Music Arts in Zaječar and studied the piano. She performed her first solo concert when she was ten. At the concert in Ukraine, she was accompanied by the Lavovski Philharmonic Orchestra. She has won many awards at the national and international piano and singing competitions. Since 2003, she has been singing in the choir "Collegium Musicum" conducted by Darinka Matić Marović.

Beauty Queens 
See Beauty Queens.

Discography

With Beauty Queens

Albums
2008: TBA

Singles
2007: "Pet na jedan"
2007: "Protiv srca"
2008: "Zavet"

External links 
Beauty Queens Official Site

1986 births
Living people
People from Zaječar
21st-century Serbian women singers
Beovizija contestants